Ysé Tardan-Masquelier is an essayist and historian of religion, specialising in Hinduism. She teaches eastern spirituality at the Paris-Sorbonne University-Sorbonne and the Institut Catholique de Paris.

Works 
 Apprendre à être heureux, collectif, Albin Michel, 2008. Avec  Lytta Basset, Pascal Bruckner, Marek Halter, Jean-Yves Leloup, Gérard Miller
 Un milliard d'hindous, Albin Michel, 2007
 La quête de guérison. Médecine et religions face à la souffrance, Michel Meslin, Bayard Culture, 2006
 Le livre des sagesses (avec Frédéric Lenoir), Bayard Culture, 2005
 L'esprit du yoga, Albin Michel, 2005.
 Jung et la question du sacré, Albin Michel, 1998.

Writers from Paris
1949 births
French Indologists
French essayists
French historians of religion
Living people